John Francis "Jack" Morrison, known by his code name Soldier: 76, is a playable character in Blizzard Entertainment's Overwatch and its 2022 sequel Overwatch 2, both of which are team-based multiplayer first-person shooters. In the games, Jack is an American soldier-turned-vigilante and a founding member of the game's titular organization. Designed to appeal to newcomer players, Soldier: 76 wears a visor on top of his facemask and carries an experimental rifle. Soldier: 76 originated as a comic book concept conceived by former Blizzard employee Chris Metzen in the early 2000s, and is later modified and repurposed for inclusion in Overwatch. A short story published by Blizzard in January 2019 details his past relationship with his same-sex domestic partner.

Soldier: 76 was a highly popular choice for players during the early years of the first game. The character's revelation as an openly gay man has been met with a generally positive reception from players, though some commentators have expressed their concerns and doubt about the sincerity of the developers as well as the player community for inclusivity.

Story and character
Jack Morrison was born in rural Indiana, and enlisted in the United States military when he was eighteen. His bravery and work ethic earned him the attention of the "soldier enhancement program", and he later joined the Overwatch organization alongside his friend Gabriel Reyes. His contributions to its success in ending the Omnic Crisis led to his being granted command of the task force, leading to a rift between him and Reyes. As Overwatch came under worldwide scrutiny due to allegations of corruption, the tensions between the two men came to outright conflict, resulting in the destruction of Overwatch headquarters. Morrison was believed to have been killed in the explosion, and was reportedly buried at Arlington National Cemetery.

Five years later, however, Morrison resurfaced as the vigilante "Soldier: 76", becoming the focus of an international manhunt following a series of attacks against former Overwatch facilities, stealing weapons and advanced technologies. He wages a personal war to discover the truth behind the events that led to the fall of Overwatch. Reyes himself also resurfaced as an operative  for the Talon organization, having assumed the identity of a notorious mercenary and terrorist known as "the Reaper".

Development and design
Soldier: 76 was originally developed by Overwatchs creative director Chris Metzen in the early 2000s as part of non-gaming related projects within Blizzard, and which he later adapted for a comic story used in Digital Webbing Presents #16, published in July 2004. Metzen envisioned Soldier: 76 as one of a line of American supersoldiers that had been implanted with microchips to give them superhuman abilities. In this version of his backstory, Soldier: 76 was thought killed in an assassination attempt but instead found himself abandoned in South America with no memories of his past, only returning to the United States after a second civil war breaks out, to help try to restore order and discover his past.

Then-lead writer Michael Chu noted that Soldier: 76 is a character who is "near and dear" to Metzen and that he gave permission to the developmental team to incorporate him into Overwatch. According to Metzen, the character's real name references both John Wayne and Jim Morrison. Although Metzen's original design for the character has been modified for Overwatch, with a visor and face mask replacing his hood mask, he still maintains the same color scheme and jacket that was used in the comic book story.

Following the confirmation of the character's sexual orientation, Chu explained that Jack and Vincent were in a romantic relationship during their youth, and that both characters identify as gay men, making him the second confirmed LGBT character of the Overwatch roster after Tracer. A preview of the character's design for the upcoming Overwatch 2 depicts an apparent accentuation of the character's grizzled soldier aesthetic.

Soldier: 76 is voiced by American voice actor Fred Tatasciore.

Appearances
Soldier: 76 appears in an animated short titled "Hero", which premiered during the final Overwatch season for 2016, and as an announcer for the Overwatch Year of the Pig promotional event in 2019.

In the "Bastet" short story released by Blizzard in January 2019, it is revealed that Morrison had a past relationship with a man named Vincent prior to his tenure in Overwatch.

Gameplay
Soldier: 76's Heavy Pulse Rifle comes with an underbarrel launcher that fires three Helix Rockets. His abilities are Sprint, a forward run with no duration limit or cooldown, and Biotic Field, a deployable device which regenerates the health of allies in the immediate vicinity. His ultimate ability, Tactical Visor, puts up a head-up display that allows his rifle to automatically track enemies in his line of sight for a brief period. While Soldier: 76 was conceived as a "gateway hero" to help players that are used to modern shooters ease into the game, his versatility and high skill ceiling makes him a good choice for veteran players as well. He is able to perform well in almost any situation, being effective on all ranges, move quickly around the battlefield, as well as able to heal both himself and his team. On the downside, unlike other attackers, he lacks a direct specialization, and his ultimate ability has less potential impact on the game. His pulse rifle is best fired in short bursts at range and in full auto in close quarters, where accuracy is less of an issue. A year after the release of Overwatch, Blizzard had considered readjusting the character's gameplay capabilities, such as his spread and burst damage.

Promotion and merchandise
Like other Overwatch characters, Soldier: 76 is referenced in an Overwatch-themed cookbook published by Insight Editions.

Various merchandise including Nendoroid depicting Soldier: 76 has been made. In June 2019, Nerf made a Soldier: 76 blaster toy. In May 2020, Soldier: 76 was announced as the tenth entry in Good Smile Company's figma line for Overwatch.

Reception

Soldier: 76 was the most popular offense character during the game's open beta. Abe Stein from Kill Screen thought of Soldier: 76 as the "boring nationalist dude-bro to emphasize the diversity and uniqueness among the rest of the cast", an accessible character serving as a standard for which all other characters are measured against. Dave Smith from Business Insider commented on SpaceX CEO Elon Musk's disclosure that he uses Soldier: 76 as his main character in Overwatch games in early 2017, which he interpreted as part of the character's ease of use and widespread appeal as a "solid, well-rounded character in a super-popular online multiplayer game". In an article published in October 2020, Imogen Mellor from PCGamesN rated Soldier: 76 as one of the ideal choices for beginner players of Overwatch.

The character has since become a popular subject for fan art, with many fans depicting him as a father figure for other Overwatch characters. Following the release of a teaser trailer for Fallout 76, fans began sharing in-jokes and fan art which references the digits in the character's codename and the then-upcoming game's title as well as the character's crossover potential. Connor Sheridan of GamesRadar considered Soldier: 76, together with Tracer and Winston, to be the "three most iconic Overwatch characters".

The revelation of Soldier: 76's sexual orientation through the "Bastet" story in early 2019 is generally well received by the game's player base. While several critics lauded the inclusion of another LGBT character in Overwatch after Tracer, some interpreted the manner in which the revelation was delivered to be a calculated public relations tactic, as the depiction of the character's sexuality is relegated to an aspect of world-building lore that they believe only a minority of players would be aware of. Matt Kim from USGamer drew an analogy to British author J.K. Rowling's method of revealing the sexuality of the Harry Potter character Albus Dumbledore, which he described as abrupt and lacked any meaningful context.

Writing for Polygon, Kenneth Shepard noted that the revelation of Soldier: 76 as a gay man got him interested in playing Overwatch, but expressed disappointment at his personal experiences when playing as the character, in particular the hostile reactions from other players to an in-game cosmetic item he frequently used, which explicitly references the character's relationship with Vincent. Shepard, who is openly gay, said the promotion of Soldier: 76's past in the game's lore "feels more like a trap than an honest invitation", and criticized Blizzard for not being "brave enough to let the character be who he is in the game itself", and that they have passively enabled the conditions of a toxic environment that makes certain players like him feel threatened and harassed. Jade King from TheGamer expressed hope that Blizzard will build upon goodwill generated from the first game's queer representation and treat Soldier: 76 and Tracer, its most important LGBT characters, with greater respect for the upcoming Overwatch 2.

References

Comics characters introduced in 2004
Fictional American military personnel
Fictional American people in video games
Fictional characters from Indiana
Fictional gay males
Fictional outlaws
Fictional soldiers in video games
Fictional super soldiers
Fictional United Nations personnel
LGBT characters in video games
LGBT characters in comics
Male characters in comics
Male characters in video games
Overwatch characters
Video game characters introduced in 2016
Vigilante characters in video games
Male characters in animated films
Fictional characters with healing abilities